4th Wall is the debut studio album by Australian singer-songwriter Ruel, released on 3 March 2023. The album was announced on 25 January 2023.

The title is inspired by scenes from Ruel's favourite films; primarily The Truman Show and Fight Club. The fourth wall imagines Ruel finding out his entire life is a lie, being filmed for someone else's entertainment.

Upon announcement, Ruel said "I spent the last 3 years writing it and wound up with over 100 songs. I rewrote half of them and re-recorded most of them, until they sounded exactly as I heard them in my head. It's been the biggest journey making this record and I know I kept you waiting for it, but on March 3rd, it'll be all yours. I'm so proud of it, thank you so, so much for sticking with me."

Ruel announced the first leg of his 4th Wall World Tour, will commence in Australia and New Zealand in April 2023.

Reception

Milky Milky Milky said "On his debut offering, Ruel comes to the realisation that life isn't all it appears to be. There's a complexity to the human existence, one that is heightened during the transitionary period towards adulthood. And that, in all its essence, is what forms the conceptual basis of 4th Wall... Overall, 4th Wall is a finely crafted capsule of stories that indicate the trajectory Australian pop music is heading. Subtly threading in nostalgic and multi-genre notes across the body of work speaks to how we consume music, influenced by different genres. The record takes influences that are so relatable, and adds junctures that either hark back to, or become, annotations within the album. Ruel has delivered a multi-faceted body of work that cements his place as one of Australia's most engaging contemporary acts."

Robin Murray from Clash Magazine said "Taken as a whole, 4th Wall is ruthlessly entertaining and undeniably ambitious, with Ruel chopping down the excess to leave only prime cuts. A punchy introductory gambit, the album finds the Australian pop trailblazer hauling down the walls while letting fans into his world."

Track listing

Notes
  signifies a primary and vocal producer
  signifies a co-producer
  signifies an additional producer

Personnel
Musicians

 Ruel – vocals (all tracks), guitar (track 9)
 Spencer Stewart – bass guitar (1, 2, 4), guitar (2, 4); background vocals, drum machine, piano (4)
 Jake Reed – drums (1)
 Daniel Walsh – guitar (1, 2, 6, 10)
 Beau Golden – piano (1, 3, 6, 11), synthesizer (1, 12), keyboards (7, 12)
 Jan Bangma – bass guitar (2, 10, 12)
 Gabe Simon – guitar (2); background vocals, bass guitar, percussion (6)
 Pearl Lion – bass guitar, guitar (3)
 M-Phazes – background vocals (4), drum machine (4, 8), synthesizer (8), vocals (10)
 Aidan Rodriguez – background vocals (4), acoustic guitar (5, 8), electric guitar (5), keyboards (8, 11), synthesizer (14)
 Dora Jar – background vocals (4)
 Julian Bunetta – bass guitar, electric guitar (5)
 Colin Munroe – background vocals (7, 8)
 Blake Straus – bass guitar (7)
 Hillary Smith – cello (7)
 Jake Torrey – guitar (7)
 Emiko Bankson – strings (7)
 Ted Case – strings (7)
 Sofia Kim – viola (7)
 Carrie Kennedy – violin (7)
 Michelle Shin – violin (7)
 Sean Hurley – bass guitar (8)
 Sammy Witte – bass guitar, drum machine, guitar, keyboards, programming (9)
 Joseph E-Shine Mizrachi – guitar (10)
 Scott Dittrich – guitar (10)
 Ben Johnson – vocals (10)
 Casey Smith – vocals (10)
 Rahel Phillips – background vocals (12)
 Ethan Gruska – guitar (12)
 Tom Barnes – bass guitar (13)
 Ben Kohn – organ (13)
 Peter Kelleher – synthesizer (13)
 PJ Harding – guitar (14)
 Ian Peres – synthesizer (14)

Technical
 Ruairi O'Flaherty – mastering (1–4, 6, 7, 11–14)
 Dale Becker – mastering (5, 8–10)
 Lars Stalfors – mixing (1–4, 6, 7, 11–14)
 Eric J. Dubowsky – mixing (5, 8–10)
 Sammy Witte – engineering (9)
 M-Phazes – vocal engineering (9)
 Connor Hedge – engineering assistance (9)
 Matt Curtin – engineering assistance (9)

Charts

Release history

References

2023 debut albums
Albums produced by M-Phazes
Ruel (singer) albums
Sony Music Australia albums